Fort Jakob, Jakob Fort, or Fort Jakobus may refer to:

Fort Jakob (Tobago), a Courland colony
Fort Jakob (Gambia), a Courland colony